The pricklenose silverside (Atherion africanum) is a species of silverside from the family Atherionidae. It is found in the western Indian Ocean from India to KwaZulu Natal in South Africa. This species was described in 1965 by James Leonard Brierley Smith from a type locality of Inhaca Island, Mozambique. It is distinguished from similar species of silverside within its range by the rough, shagreen-like skin around its snout.

References

Atherion
Fish described in 1965